Malakai Fonokalafi Fekitoa (born 10 May 1992) is a Tongan rugby union player who plays as a centre. He currently plays for Irish club Munster. He previously played for the Highlanders in the Super Rugby competition,  in the ITM Cup, and for New Zealand internationally. He was a member of the title-winning 2015 Highlanders side, and of the 2015 Rugby World Cup-winning New Zealand side.

Early life
Fekitoa was born in Haʻapai, Tonga. He has a sister. After playing for Tonga 7s on a tour of New Zealand, he was offered a rugby scholarship and enrolled at Wesley College.

Club career
However, he only made one appearance in 2013 for the Blues against France, and signed with the Highlanders for the 2014 Super Rugby season. He was a key member of the Highlanders title winning-side in 2015. In July 2017, Fekitoa confirmed that he had signed a two-year contract with French Top 14 side Toulon. In January 2019, it was announced that Fekitoa had signed for English Premiership Rugby side Wasps from the beginning of the 2019–20 season.

Fekitoa moved to Ireland to join United Rugby Championship club Munster on a two-year contract from the 2022–23 season, and made his senior competitive debut for the province in their 20–13 defeat away to Welsh side Cardiff in round one of the 2022–23 United Rugby Championship on 17 September 2022. Fekitoa featured off the bench in Munster's historic 28–14 win against a South Africa XV in Páirc Uí Chaoimh on 10 November 2022. He will leave Munster upon the conclusion of the 2022–23 season, despite having signed a two-year contract.

Fekitoa will join Italian United Rugby Championship club Benetton on a three-year contract from the 2023–24 season.

International career

New Zealand
Fekitoa became eligible for selection for the New Zealand after completing three years post-education residency in New Zealand. After completing his residency period, he was selected as a rookie in the New Zealand squad for the June 2014 test series against England, with coach Steve Hansen having signalled interest in him during the Super Rugby season. He made his debut as a replacement player in first test of that series, a 20–15 win. With first-choice centre Conrad Smith injured out of the third and final test of the series, Fekitoa moved into the starting XV. His performance earned praise, with the Herald on Sunday saying that "the All Blacks coach has found the most elegant of solutions for Conrad Smith's back-up, one who carries more of an attacking threat than the veteran centre".

Fekitoa was selected again in 2014 for the New Zealand squad for The Rugby Championship. He was originally named as a reserve for the first test against Australia, however, with Conrad Smith and his wife expecting, Fekitoa was called up into the starting XV. He was a member of the 2015 Rugby World Cup winning New Zealand side.

Fekitoa became a regular starter for the All Blacks in 2016, combining with Ryan Crotty to form the midfield partnership for the Wales series in June. Fekitoa began to experience very erratic form however, and did not play against Argentina and South Africa that year. Fekitoa lost his starting spot to Anton Lienert-Brown, coming off the bench for the final Bledisloe Cup and the first Ireland fixture that year. Fekitoa re-gained his starting spot for the next two tests due to Crotty being injured, with Lienert Brown moving to inside centre so that Fekitoa could play outside centre. Fekitoa scored 2 tries in two games, the All Blacks were against Italy and Ireland. Fekitoa was yellow carded for a dangerous tackle against Ireland, so was cited and suspended for the final test match of the year.

Fekitoa was not initially selected for the All Blacks in 2017 for the British & Irish Lions tour but was called up for the third test match after Sonny Bill Williams was issued a red card for a shoulder block hit on Anthony Watson of the Lions in the second test match. Fekitoa played his final test match for New Zealand on 8 July 2017 in the final test against the Lions, coming off the bench to replace Ngani Laumape.

Tonga
In 2022, Fekitoa was selected in the Tongan squad for the 2022 Pacific Nations Cup, having become eligible after World Rugby's eligibility rules were amended to allow for players to switch national allegiance after completing a stand-down period. He made his debut for Tonga on 2 July 2022, in a 36-0 loss to Fiji.

Fundraising
Following the 2022 Hunga Tonga–Hunga Ha'apai eruption and tsunami, Fekitoa, whose family still lives in Tonga, setup a fundraising appeal to provide aid, raising in excess of £50,000. Wasps, Fekitoa's club at the time, supported his fundraising effort by donating 20% of the match ticket revenue from their fixture against Saracens on 30 January 2022.

References

External links
Munster Profile
Wasps Profile

Premiership Rugby Profile

1992 births
Living people
People from Haʻapai
Tongan emigrants to New Zealand
People educated at Wesley College, Auckland
Tongan rugby union players
New Zealand rugby union players
Auckland rugby union players
Blues (Super Rugby) players
Highlanders (rugby union) players
RC Toulonnais players
Wasps RFC players
Munster Rugby players

New Zealand international rugby union players
Tonga international rugby union players
Tongan expatriate rugby union players
Expatriate rugby union players in Ireland
Tongan expatriate sportspeople in Ireland

Rugby union centres